Schramm (1993) is a German horror film written and directed by Jörg Buttgereit, with screenplay credit also to Franz Rodenkirchen. It tells  the story of a man referred to in the media as the 'Lipstick Killer', who is believed to have had multiple victims.

Synopsis 
Lothar Schramm is a polite, neighborly cab driver who makes an honest living. Sometimes he invites callers in for cognac, such as a couple who come to his door seeking to tell him about Jesus. Later he might slit their throats and assemble their bodies in suggestive poses.

He lives next door to a young, beautiful prostitute named Marianne, with whom he is smitten. Schramm is lonely. His sex life is seriously deranged, with various expressions, and his social life is nonexistent. He whitewashes bloodstains from his murders off the walls of his flat.

When Marianne is invited by some affluent gentlemen clients to a villa outside of town, she asks Schramm to chauffeur her so she'll be safe. He accepts and afterward invites her to a friendly dinner, ignoring his desire for her. He takes her back to his flat, where he drugs, strips, and photographs her. He masturbates over her naked body. The next day Marianne rings at his door for a lift, but Schramm does not answer. He has fallen from a ladder while painting over the blood on his walls and dies. His head has cracked on the floor.

The last passage shows Marianne in the villa outside of town, attired like a Hitler Youth, and bound and gagged on a chair. She is a helpless victim to her twisted clients. Papers report the 'Lonesome Death of Lipstick Killer.'

Cast
Florian Koerner von Gustorf as Lothar Schramm
Monika M. as Marianne
Micha Brendel as Der Gläubige
Carolina Harnisch as Die Gläubige
Xaver Schwarzenberger as Älterer Herr 1
Gerd Horvath as Älterer Herr 2
Michael Brynntrup as Jesus
Franz Rodenkirchen as Zahnarzt 
Anne Presting as Zahnärztin
Eddi Zacharias as Liebhaber
Michael Romahn as Selbstmörder
Volker Hauptvogel as Kellner

Background
The film opens with a quote by American serial killer Carl Panzram (executed 1930). It is loosely based on the criminology profiles of him and other documented killers.

References
 Kerekes, D. (1998). Sex, Murder, Art: The Films of Jörg Buttgereit. Manchester: HEADPRESS.
 Koven, M. J. (2007). Buttgereit's Poetics: 'Schramm' as a Cinema of Poetry. In Hantke, S. Caligari's Heirs: The German Cinema of Fear after 1945. pp. 185–197. Lanham, Maryland, Toronto, Plymouth UK: The Scarecrow Press Inc.
 Stiglegger, M. (2007). "Good News From the Underground: A Conversation with Jörg Buttgereit." In Hantke, S. Caligari's Heirs: The German Cinema of Fear after 1945. pp. 219–226. Lanham, Maryland, Toronto, Plymouth UK: The Scarecrow Press Inc.

External links 
 
 Jelinski & Buttgereit Online

1993 films
1993 horror films
Films directed by Jörg Buttgereit
German horror films
1990s German-language films
German serial killer films
Necrophilia in film
Films about self-harm
1990s German films